Al-Mushahid Al-riyadiya is a newspaper in Sudan.

See also 
 List of newspapers in Sudan

External links
 https://web.archive.org/web/20111119110704/http://www.mushahidsd.net/%28)

Newspapers published in Sudan
Arabic newspapers